Fernbrook Farms is a  working farm located along County Route 545 (Bordentown-Georgetown Road) in Chesterfield Township in Burlington County, New Jersey. Originally an 18th-century farm, it was briefly a stock breeding farm, known as the New Warlaby Stock Farm, in the 19th century. It now includes an inn, plant nursery, environmental education center, and community-supported agriculture. It was added to the National Register of Historic Places on July 7, 2022, for its significance in architecture and landscape architecture.

History 
In 1760, John Newbold acquired  of farm land along the Fern Brook from his father Michael Newbold. He then built a two and one-half story frame farmhouse for the estate, . The house was expanded in 1791 by adding two bays. In 1881, Charles Morgan purchased  to raise premium breeding cattle. In 1897, John L. Kuser moved there, and in 1899, he purchased the property. After his death in 1937, his son Walter G. Kuser inherited the property. Lawrence Kuser and his wife Susie started living there in 1974.

Historic district 
The Fernbrook Historic District is a  historic district encompassing the core part of the farm. It was added to the National Register of Historic Places on July 7, 2022, for its significance in architecture and landscape architecture. The district has eleven contributing buildings, six contributing structures, and one contributing site. The Federal-style John Newbold House is the main contributing property in the district. A cedar shaked water tower, built , provided water pressure and filtration for Morgan's mansion and the formal Colonial Revival gardens.

Agriculture 
They were shorthorns of the Booth stock from Warlaby. He renamed the farm, New Warlaby, and established a model breeding farm. However, by 1885, he had sold the cattle to Leslie Combs of Kentucky.

A plant nursery operation was started in the 1970s. A community-supported agriculture (CSA) component was added in 2007.

Education 
In 2001, Larry and Susie Kuser established an environmental education center on the property.

See also 
 Model farm
 National Register of Historic Places listings in Burlington County, New Jersey
 List of the oldest buildings in New Jersey
 List of nature centers in New Jersey

References

External links 
 
 

Chesterfield Township, New Jersey
Nature centers in New Jersey
National Register of Historic Places in Burlington County, New Jersey
Historic districts on the National Register of Historic Places in New Jersey
Farms on the National Register of Historic Places in New Jersey
New Jersey Register of Historic Places
Colonial Revival architecture in New Jersey
Federal architecture in New Jersey